David Fraser Cameron (12 September 1895 – 27 July 1953) was a Scottish professional footballer who played in the Football League for Chelsea as a wing half.

Personal life 
Cameron served in the Highland Light Infantry and the Queen's Own Cameron Highlanders during the First World War and rose to the rank of sergeant. His elder brother Macdonald, also a footballer for Queen's Park, was killed at Passchendaele in 1917.

Career statistics

References

1895 births
1953 deaths
People from Partick
Footballers from Glasgow
Scottish footballers
Scottish Football League players
British Army personnel of World War I
Highland Light Infantry soldiers
Association football wing halves
Queen's Park F.C. players
Chelsea F.C. players
English Football League players
Helensburgh F.C. players
Queen's Own Cameron Highlanders soldiers